Vincent "Vinnie" Fiorello (born June 24, 1974) is an American rock musician and businessman. He co-founded the ska punk band Less Than Jake in 1992, and was the band's drummer and lyricist until 2018. He also founded the record labels Fueled by Ramen, Sleep It Off Records, and Paper + Plastick, in addition to several local businesses in Gainesville, Florida.

Biography
Fiorello was born on June 24, 1974 in Rahway, New Jersey. He grew up in New Jersey but moved to Gainesville, Florida at age 16.

Vinnie Fiorello and Chris DeMakes founded the band Less Than Jake while attending the University of Florida in 1992. Band members have told various media outlets different versions of the origin of the band's name. DeMakes has stated in interviews that the band's name came from Fiorello's family's pet parrot. His story claimed that the parrot would squawk during the band's practice sessions, leading to Fiorello's mother telling the band that they needed to stop playing because they were disturbing the bird. This would lead to the band referring to themselves as being "less than Jake." In June 2020, however, Fiorello clarified that Jake was not a parrot but was, in fact, an English Bulldog.

In 1996, Fiorello co-founded the record label Fueled by Ramen with John Janick. He left the label in 2006.

In the summer of 2015, Fiorello and his friend Eric Jazvac opened a tattoo parlor, Wunderland Custom Tattooing, in downtown Gainesville, Florida.

On October 24, 2018, Fiorello announced that while he would remain a member of Less Than Jake, he would no longer be touring with the band. After Fiorello's announcement, the band recruited Teen Idols drummer Matt Yonker as their touring drummer. On September 1, 2019, Roger Lima announced via social media that despite prior reports, Fiorello was no longer with the band in any capacity and would not be participating in the creation of the band's upcoming album.

In October 2019, High Times reported that Fiorello had founded a CBD brand called Sailor Diggen's Finest.

Personal life
Fiorello has a daughter, Liliana Rose, who was born on September 3, 2011.

See also
 Less Than Jake
 Fueled by Ramen

References

External links
 

1974 births
American punk rock drummers
American male drummers
Living people
Musicians from New Jersey
People from Port Charlotte, Florida
Musicians from Gainesville, Florida
Port Charlotte High School alumni
University of Florida alumni
20th-century American drummers
21st-century American drummers
20th-century American male musicians
21st-century American male musicians
Businesspeople in the cannabis industry
American music industry executives
21st-century American businesspeople
American lyricists